Tăriceanu Cabinet may refer to:
 Tăriceanu I Cabinet, the cabinet of the government of Romania between 2004 and 2007
 Tăriceanu II Cabinet, the cabinet of the government of Romania between 2007 and 2008

fr:Gouvernement Tăriceanu